The Black-eyed Snakes is an American blues rock band from Duluth, Minnesota. Since releasing their debut album "It's the Black-eyed Snakes" in 2001, the band has toured the U.S., including with Charlie Parr, among others. Front man Alan Sparhawk also performs with Low and Retribution Gospel Choir.

The Black-eyed Snakes often perform at the Homegrown Music Festival in Duluth, Minnesota. Black-eyed Snakes was selected by City Pages as the Best New Band of 2001. Sparhawks described the band's attitude towards the blues: "We actually hate most blues. We were trying to destroy it. We're interested in putting the blues back into a gut level – instead of talent, we go with feeling more."

Lineup
 Alan Sparhawk – guitar, vocals
 Bob Olson – guitar
 Brad Nelson – drums
 Justin Sparhawk – percussion
 Bryan "Lefty" Johnson – percussion

Discography

Studio albums
 It's the Black-eyed Snakes – (Chairkickers' Union Music, 2001)
 Rise Up! – (Chairkickers' Union Music, 2003)
 Seven Horses - (Chairkickers' Union Music, 2018)

Singles
 "Chicken Bone George" (7") – (Shaky Ray Records, 2001)

Compilations
 Duluth Does Dylan – (Spinout Records, 2000)
 Sun Records the Ultimate Blues Collection – (Varese Fontana, 2003)
 Perverted by Mark E. / A Tribute to the Fall – (Zick Zack indigo, 2004)
 Homegrown Rawk and/or Roll: Starfire's Mix – (Homegrown Music Festival, 2008)

DVDs
 "Cross Country with the Snakes" (film by Hansi Johnson) – (Chairkickers' Union Music, 2005)

References

Maerz, Melissa. God Gave Rock 'n' Roll to You City Pages, October 10, 2001.
Riemenschneider, Chris. Slitherin' Dither - Black-eyed Snakes Found a Way to Reinvigorate the Blues. Star Tribune, October 12, 2001.
Royston, Reggie. Black-eyed Snakes Saint Paul Pioneer Press, December 19, 2003.
Virtucio, V. Paul. Snakes Open Some Eyes Duluth News-Tribune, August 11, 2001.

External links
 
 Myspace profile

Musical groups from Minnesota
Musical groups established in 1999
1999 establishments in Minnesota